Live in Paris is the first live album and video album by Canadian singer Diana Krall, released on October 1, 2002, by Verve Records. The album was recorded during Krall's sold-out concerts at Paris's Olympia from November 29 to December 2, 2001, and includes songs from her albums Only Trust Your Heart (1995), All for You: A Dedication to the Nat King Cole Trio (1996), When I Look in Your Eyes (1999), and The Look of Love (2001).

In the United States alone, the album has sold over 500,000 copies while the video has sold over 200,000 copies. The album won the 2003 Grammy Award for Best Jazz Vocal Album and the 2003 Juno Award for Vocal Jazz Album of the Year. Billboard ranked the album at number eight on the magazine's Top Jazz Albums of the Decade.

The CD album was released in the United Kingdom under the title A Night in Paris with a different cover art; the track listing omits the track "Maybe You'll Be There", while including the bonus track "Charmed Life" and the music video for "The Look of Love".

Critical reception

Christopher Loudon of JazzTimes wrote, "I'm guessing that producer Tommy LiPuma, sage pulse-taker that he is, recognized it was high time for Krall to get back to basics. If so, 10 points for Tommy. Apart from the presence, on two of the album's 11 tracks, of the syrupy but subdued Orchestre Symphonique Europeen, Live in Paris features the British Columbia beauty stripped bare, passion fully exposed, intensity cranked to 11. Raw, unplugged, pure. Krall 101".

Nail Gader of The Absolute Sound stated, "Surfaces are dead quiet, and the LP is lighter on its feet, more layered, airier, finer grained, and more transparent. Live in Paris is a great addition to a choice LP collection".

Jeff Cebulski of Paste commented, "In the meantime, Krall croons blue notes heretofore reserved for Cassandra Wilson (in Joni Mitchell's 'A Case of You'), whispers wispy ballads, and even scats a bit—a welcome return to her early form, before market-driven pressures took over".

Track listing

CD

DVD and Blu-ray

Personnel
Credits adapted from the liner notes of the Canadian edition of Live in Paris.

Musicians
 Diana Krall – vocals, piano ; Fender Rhodes 
 Anthony Wilson – guitar 
 John Clayton – bass 
 Jeff Hamilton – drums 
 Alan Broadbent – music direction, conducting 
 Orchestre Symphonique Européen – orchestra 
 John Pisano – acoustic guitar 
 Paulinho da Costa – percussion 
 Michael Brecker – tenor saxophone solo 
 Rob Mounsey – additional keyboards 
 Christian McBride – bass 
 Lewis Nash – drums 
 Luis Quintero – percussion 
 Ron Escheté – guitar

Technical
 Tommy LiPuma – production
 Al Schmitt – recording, mixing
 Steve Genewick – engineering assistance
 Bill Smith – Pro Tools engineering
 Aya Takemura – second engineer 
 Brian Montgomery – second engineer 
 Andy Sarroff – mix engineering 
 Jill Dell'Abate – production coordination 
 Doug Sax – mastering
 Robert Hadley – mastering

Artwork
 Hollis King – art direction
 Paul Lombardi – design
 Rika Ichiki – design
 Donna Ranieri – photography production
 Bruce Weber – cover photography
 Steve Lewis – back cover photography
 Peter Rad – inside booklet and tray photography

Charts

Weekly charts

Year-end charts

Certifications

Notes

References

2002 live albums
2002 video albums
Albums produced by Tommy LiPuma
Albums recorded at the Olympia (Paris)
Diana Krall live albums
Eagle Rock Entertainment video albums
Grammy Award for Best Jazz Vocal Album
Juno Award for Vocal Jazz Album of the Year albums
Live video albums
Verve Records live albums